Dal is a village in Eidsvoll, Akershus, Norway. The village has a railway station, Dal Station, served by the Oslo Commuter Rail.

Villages in Akershus